This is a list of episodes for The Colbert Report in 2010.

2010

January

February

March

April

May 

No new shows the last two weeks of May.

June

July 

The Colbert Report broadcast no new episodes from 12 to 23 Jul 2010 due to a scheduled break.  This coincided with a similar two week break for The Daily Show.

August

September

October

November

December

Notes
 Hans Beinholtz is a fictional character played by Erik Frandsen.

References

External links

 
 
 

2010
2010 American television seasons
2010 in American television